Harold Wright may refer to:

 Harold Madison Wright (1908–1997), Canadian engineer and athlete
 Harold Wright (clarinetist) (1926–1993), American clarinetist
 Harold Bell Wright (1872–1944), American writer
 Harold Wright (greyhound trainer) (1884–1974)
 Harold Wright (cricketer) (1884–1915), English cricketer
 Harold Wright (politician) (born 1947), American politician in the Oklahoma House of Representatives
 Harold Louis Wright, American prelate

See also
Harry Wright (disambiguation)